Sean Stoddart (born 20 January 1987) in Edinburgh, Scotland, is a retired speedway rider in the United Kingdom.

References

External links

1987 births
Living people
British speedway riders
Scottish motorcycle racers
Newcastle Diamonds riders
Scottish speedway riders